Auguste Houzeau (3 March 1829, Elbeuf – 17 February 1911, Rouen) was a French agronomist and chemist.

He studied at the Conservatoire national des arts et métiers in Paris, where he took chemistry classes from Jean-Baptiste Boussingault. He later served as a professor at the École préparatoire à l'enseignement supérieur des sciences et des lettres in Rouen, and in 1883 was appointed  director of the Station agronomique de la Seine-Inférieure. He was also president of the Société centrale d'agriculture de la Seine-Maritime.

He is remembered for his investigations on the nature of ozone and its diffusion into the atmosphere; as well as for various studies of fertilizers and for his research involving apple pomace. He was the recipient of several awards during his career, such as:

 (1862): The Médaille de vermeil from the Société industrielle d'Elbeuf. 
 (1870): Chevalier of the Légion d'honneur, being promoted to officer in 1895.
 (1872): The Médaille d'or of the Sociétés savantes à la Sorbonne.
 (1872): Platinum medal from the Société d'encouragement of Paris. 
 (1877): The Prix Jecker for his work associated with ozone.
 The Ordre du Lion et du Soleil of Persia.

Published works 
 Histoire de la houille et de ses dérivés, 1863 – History of coal and its derivatives.
 Organisation de la station agronomique de Rouen, 1863 – Organization of the agronomic station at Rouen.
 Sur la génération naturelle et artificielle de l'ozone, 1874 – On the natural and artificial generation of ozone.
 Instruction sur l’emploi de l’azotimètre pour le tirage des engrais azotés, 1874 – Instruction on the use of an azotimeter with nitrogen fertilizers.
 Détermination de la valeur des engrais, 1875 – Determining the value of fertilizer.
 Le Marc de pommes, sa composition, son emploi, sa conservation, 1887 – Apple pomace, composition, usage, conservation.
 Sur la composition de quelques fumiers, et sur un moyen simple d’apprécier dans la pratique agricole la composition des fumiers ainsi que leur valeur relative en argent, 1888 – On the composition of various manures, etc.
 Station agronomique de la Seine-Inférieure. Fruits à pressoir et marcs de pommes et de poires, leur emploi dans la ferme : rations nouvelles pour suppléer au manque de fourrage, 1893.

References 

1829 births
1911 deaths
French agronomists
19th-century French chemists
Members of the French Academy of Sciences
People from Elbeuf